Pyar Ka Mandir (lit. Temple of Love) is a 1988 Indian Hindi-language drama film directed by K. Bapaiah. The film stars Mithun Chakraborty, Madhavi, Nirupa Roy, Raj Kiran, Shoma Anand, Kader Khan and Aruna Irani. The music was composed by Laxmikant-Pyarelal.

Synopsis
Laxmi Kumar (Nirupa Roy), a widowed school teacher, lives with her three sons, Sanjay, Vijay and Ajay, and daughter, Meena in their family home they call "House of Love". The talented Vijay secretly does manual labor to augment his mom's income, so that his brothers can study IAS and law respectively.

Meena is to be married to a young man named Satish, and Laxmi goes to withdraw her chit fund from Gopal Khaitan, only to find out that he has duped her. The devastated family gather to confront this, only to have their mom lose her teaching job. Vijay swears to apprehend Gopal, a confrontation ensues, and Gopal is killed. In this way Vijay gets the money so that Meena's wedding takes place, while his brothers continue to study. Vijay is arrested, found guilty and sentenced to seven years in prison.

After his discharge, Vijay returns home to find that their family home has been sold. Ajay, who is now the collector, has married Sapna, a very wealthy woman. They have a daughter, Geeta, and are living in a government bungalow; Sanjay is now a lawyer and is living in a palatial home. Both brothers reject Vijay and have nothing to do with him. Devastated he starts driving an auto-rickshaw for a living, hoping that he meets with his mother, who, as he has been told by his brothers, is away on a religious pilgrimage. Vijay does meet his mom, who is working as a common laborer at a construction site, and confronts his brothers. The truth will be revealed as to why Vijay confessed to killing Gopal.

Cast

Mithun Chakraborty as  Vijay Kumar
Madhavi as Radha
Raj Kiran as Collector Ajay Kumar
Sachin as Lawyer  Sanjay Kumar
Shraddha Verma as Meena Kumar, Vijay's Sister
Shoma Anand as Sapna
Nirupa Roy as Mrs. Laxmi Kumar
Satyen Kappu as Mr Kumar  Seen in Only Photo in Photoframe ( Uncredited)
Kader Khan as Dr. Bhuleshwarchand Bhuljaanewala
Aruna Irani as Mrs. Shanti Bhuljaanewala
Bharat Kapoor as Gopal Seth
Prema Narayan as Anita Seth
Shakti Kapoor as Dilip
Raza Murad as Azam Khan
Asrani as Patient
Dhumal as Patient
Javed Khan Amrohi as Patient 
Viju Khote as Compounder
Rajendranath as Astrologer Parmeshwar Shivaramakrishna
Satish Kaul as Satish, Meena's Husband
Bharat Bhushan as Satish's Father
Jack Gaud as Goon of Dilip
Vikas Anand as Police Inspector

Music
"Pyar Ke Pahle Kadam Pe" - Kishore Kumar, Alka Yagnik
"O Meri Jaan Meri Jaan" - Mohammad Aziz, Alka Yagnik
"Jhopad Patti Zindabad" - Kishore Kumar
"Aye Duniya Tujhko Salam" - Kishore Kumar
"Log Jahan Per Rahate Hain" - Mohammad Aziz, Suresh Wadkar, Kavita Krishnamurthy, Udit Narayan
"Log Jahan Per Rahate Hain" (Sad) - Mohammad Aziz

Box office
The film was a super hit and fifth highest-grossing movie of 1988.

References

External links

1988 films
1980s Hindi-language films
Films directed by K. Bapayya
Films scored by Laxmikant–Pyarelal